Calvary Baptist Church is an Independent Baptist church, located at 123 West 57th Street between the Avenue of the Americas (Sixth Avenue) and Seventh Avenue, near Carnegie Hall in Midtown Manhattan, New York City. , the church is at a temporary location while its building at 123 West 57th Street is being demolished and replaced.

History
The church was founded in 1847, and its first sanctuary was at 50 West 23rd Street, completed in 1854. It then moved to a red sandstone Gothic church designed by John Rochester Thomas at its current location, which was built in 1883-1884.  It also had a chapel at 223 West 67th Street, which was later used by St. Matthew's Roman Catholic Church.

In 1923, Calvary became one of the earliest churches to operate its own radio station and has since maintained a long tradition of widely followed religious broadcasts. "Tell It From Calvary" is a radio show that the church still produces weekly; it is heard on WMCA.

The building at 123 West 57th Street was an early example of an urban high-rise, or "skyscraper", church, a 16-story building which also included the Hotel Salisbury, an apartment hotel.  Planning for the edifice began in 1929, with the design credited to the firm of Jardine, Hall & Murdock, and the building was dedicated in 1931.  Two Steinway grand pianos were donated to the church by pianist Van Cliburn, who attended periodically while living in the hotel.

Richard Nixon and Bill Clinton have worshipped at Calvary. Billy Graham and Billy Sunday have preached there. 

In early 2020, Calvary Baptist Church and the Salisbury Hotel closed. The Gothic Revival edifice was planned to be demolished to make way for a new office building with space for the church. Following a delay due to the COVID-19 pandemic in New York City, Alchemy Properties acquired the church in July 2021, and demolition began in 2022. During the renovation, Calvary gathered every Sunday at 10 a.m. on the Manhattan campus of Hunter College, as well as online.

Senior Pastors
 1847-1849 David Bellamy
 1850-1852 John Dowling
 1852-1863 A. D. Gillette
 1864-1869 R. J. W. Buckled
 1870-1911 Robert Stuart MacArthur
 1915-1917 Joseph W. Kemp
 1918-1929 John Roach Straton. During his tenure, Calvary was nationally known as a center for fundamentalism and efforts to reform society in his vision of Bible-based morality.
 1930-1934 Will H. Houghton Houghton resigned from Calvary's pulpit to serve as the fourth president of Moody Bible Institute in Chicago, IL.
 1936-1949 William Ward Ayer A poll found preacher and religious broadcaster Ayer to be Manhattan's "third-most influential citizen", behind Eleanor Roosevelt and religious broadcaster Bishop Fulton Sheen.
 1950-1957 John Summerfield Wimbish
 1959-1973 Stephen F. Olford Olford "took it as a challenge to seek to overcome prejudice" and the church was desegregated under his leadership.  Today, the church "celebrates [the] congregation’s ethnic, racial, social-economic, generational, and cultural diversity within [the] unity in Jesus Christ" as one of its core values, a diversity that "reflects what heaven will look like one day."
 1976-1986 Dr. Donald R. Hubbard
 1989-1994 James O. Rose, Jr.
 1997–2018 David Paul Epstein
 2022 - present Abraham Joseph

References
Notes

External links 

 

Baptist churches in New York City
Churches in Manhattan
Religious organizations established in 1847
Midtown Manhattan
1847 establishments in New York (state)
Skyscrapers in Manhattan
Evangelical megachurches in the United States
Megachurches in New York (state)
Independent Baptist churches in the United States